La vie is French for "the life", such as found in the phrase "c'est la vie". 
It may refer to:

La Vie (painting), a painting by Pablo Picasso
La Vie (magazine) (formerly La Vie catholique), a Roman Catholic weekly published in France
La Vie, the annual student yearbook published by Pennsylvania State University
LaVie (computer), a laptop computer manufactured by NEC and Lenovo
Flyscooters La Vie, a brand of motor scooter

See also

 
 
 Lavie (disambiguation)
 Vie (disambiguation)
 C'est la vie (disambiguation)
 La Vie en rose (disambiguation)
 Life (disambiguation)